Haute Cuisine is a 2012 French comedy-drama film based on the true story of Danièle Mazet-Delpeuch and how she was appointed as the private chef for François Mitterrand.  The original French title is Les Saveurs du Palais.

Plot
Hortense Laborie (Catherine Frot), a renowned chef from Périgord, is astonished when the President of the Republic (Jean d'Ormesson) appoints her his personal cook, responsible for creating all his meals at the Élysée Palace. Despite jealous resentment from the other kitchen staff, Hortense quickly establishes herself, thanks to her indomitable spirit. The authenticity of her cooking soon seduces the President, but the corridors of power are littered with traps... The story is framed by Laborie's later role cooking at a French Antarctic research station.

Cast
 Catherine Frot as Hortense Laborie
 Arthur Dupont as Nicolas Bauvois
 Jean d'Ormesson as The Président
 Hippolyte Girardot as David Azoulay
 Jean-Marc Roulot as Jean-Marc Luchet
 Brice Fournier as Pascal Le Piq
 Arly Jover as Mary
 Joe Sheridan as John
 Laurent Poitrenaux as Jean-Michel Salomé
 Hervé Pierre as Perrières
 Manuel Le Lièvre as Loïc
 Steve Tran as Grégory
 Thomas Chabrol as The prefect of the Chief

Production
Parts of the movie were actually filmed at the Élysée Palace, in a three-day shooting window where filming was only allowed when then President Nicolas Sarkozy was not at the palace.

Iceland served as a stand-in for the Crozet islands in the movie. The film crew spent six days there to film on location.

Reception
The review aggregator website Rotten Tomatoes reports a 68% approval rating with an average rating of 6.1/10 based on 31 reviews. The website's consensus reads, "While it'll certainly be an easier sell for foodie filmgoers, Haute Cuisine's beautifully filmed biopic should satisfy most viewers hungry for a beautifully filmed dramedy." On Metacritic, it has a score of 61 out of 100 based on 14 reviews, indicating "generally favorable reviews".

References

External links
 
 
  (en)
 
 
 

2012 films
Cooking films
French cuisine
2010s French-language films
French comedy-drama films
2012 comedy-drama films
Films directed by Christian Vincent
Films scored by Gabriel Yared
2010s French films